Thomas Larkin may refer to:

Thomas Larkin (ice hockey) (born 1990), British-born Italian ice hockey player
Thomas B. Larkin (1890–1968), American military officer
Thomas O. Larkin (1802–1858), early American emigrant to Mexico and a signer of the original California Constitution
Tom Larkin (diplomat) (1917–2021), New Zealand public servant and diplomat
Tom Larkin (hurler) (1931–2020), Irish hurler and Gaelic footballer
Tom Larkin (musician) (born 1971), member of the New Zealand band Shihad

See also
Tommy Larkins, drummer with Jonathan Richman